, better known by her stage name , was a Japanese singer.

Biography
Junko Kido was born in Tokyo on 17 October 1956.
She won two awards at the Intercollege Original Song Contest as a university student.

She had a brief singing career, where she released three albums: two of them  and Blendy, were released for Canyon Records, and her third album ENOUGH was her only one with Polydor Records. Afterwards, she later worked as a back chorus singer and composer for several singers, including Akina Nakamori (particularly her song Mizu ni sashita hana), Arashi, Aya Hisakawa, Ayumi Hamasaki, Chemistry, Do As Infinity, Every Little Thing (band), Gackt, Izam, Joe Hisaishi, Junko Iwao, Kaho Shimada, Ken Matsudaira, Kikuko Inoue, Kyoko Fukada, Luna Sea, Mami Kingetsu, Mariko Kouda, Miho Nakayama, Miki Nakatani, Miu Sakamoto, Nana Katase, Noriko Sakai, Ryoko Moriyama, Ryuichi Kawamura, Seiko Matsuda, Shinji Tanimura, SMAP, Spitz, Sugizo, Takako Uehara, Takao Horiuchi, Takuro Yoshida, Tomoyo Harada, Vivian Hsu, Wink, Yoko Minamino, Yoshimi Iwasaki, Yui Asaka, Yui Nishiwaki, and Yumi Matsutoya.

She sang both the opening and ending of the Clamp in Wonderland anime.

She married musician Yasuhiro Kido, who outlived her. They both released their a cappella album Breath by Breath from Crown Records. Hirotani lived in Tama, Tokyo, where she died of breast cancer at the age of 63 on 4 January 2020; her husband announced her death on Facebook the next day.

References

External links
 

1956 births
2020 deaths
Singers from Tokyo
Anime singers
People from Tama, Tokyo
20th-century Japanese women singers
20th-century Japanese singers
21st-century Japanese women singers
21st-century Japanese singers
Deaths from cancer in Japan
Deaths from breast cancer